70 may refer to: 
 70 (number)
 One of the years 70 BC, AD 70, 1970, 2070 
 Seventy (Latter Day Saints), an office in the Melchizedek priesthood of several denominations within the Latter Day Saint movement
 Seventy (LDS Church), in The Church of Jesus Christ of Latter-day Saints